Amand Yegorovich Struve (30 May 1835 – 12 September 1898) was a Baltic German military engineer and bridge specialist of Russian Empire.

Struve's relatives included diplomats, engineers, government officials and military officers. He was a graduate of the main artillery school of the Imperial Russian Army and received his engineering education at the Nikolaevsky Engineer Academy.

From 1858 to 1862 he was chief of construction of the Moscow-Nizhny Novgorod Railway, which was opened from Moscow to Vladimir on 14 (26 New Style) June 1861 and to Nizhny Novgorod on 1 (13) August 1862.

In 1863 he established workshops at Kolomna to manufacture iron structures for bridge spans. This facility was converted in 1871 to manufacture machinery under the name A. Struve, Kolomna Maschinenfabrik with his brother Gustav as manager. This was the forerunner of today's Kolomensky Zavod (German: Lokomotivfabrik Kolomna).

Struve was chief of construction in 1864-65 of the Oka bridge of the Moscow-Ryazan Railway, the first bridge in Russia intended for both railway and road traffic. He next supervised construction of a section of the Moscow-Kursk Railway; this road was opened from Moscow to Kursk on 17 (29) September 1868.

From 1868 to 1870 Struve was chief of construction of the Struve Bridge on the Dnieper at Kiev. This was the first Russian bridge in which the foundation was laid using the caisson method. His subsequent bridge projects included the Dnieper bridge at Kremenchug (1870–72), the Liteiny Bridge on the Neva at St. Petersburg (1875–79), and the Alexandrovsky Bridge on the Volga at Syzran (1876-1880).

Upon completion of the Liteiny Bridge in 1879, Struve was promoted to Major General. When his brother Gustav died in 1882 he assumed management of the works at Kolomna.

In Kiev Struve built a central sewerage system, horse-pulled railway (1885–86), the first electric tramway in the Russian Empire (1891–92), and a gas-powered street lighting system.

Promoted to Lieutenant General in 1896, Struve died at Kolomna on 31 August (12 September) 1898.

External links
  Article in Zerkalo Nedeli Newspaper

1835 births
1898 deaths
Civil engineers from the Russian Empire
Russian people of German descent
Baltic-German people
Russian military engineers
19th-century engineers from the Russian Empire
Amand